Fred Anderson (born 1949) is an American historian of early North American history.

Education and career 
Anderson received his B.A. from Colorado State University in 1971 and his Ph.D. from Harvard in 1981. He has taught at Harvard and at the University of Colorado, Boulder, where he is currently Professor Emeritus of History. He has held fellowships from the National Endowment for the Humanities, the Charles Warren Center of Harvard University, the Guggenheim Foundation and the Rockefeller Foundation.

He is the author or editor of five books including Crucible of War: The Seven Years' War and the Fate of Empire in British North America, 1754-1766 (New York: Alfred A. Knopf, February 11, 2000; London: Faber and Faber, 2000), which won the Mark Lynton History Prize and the 2001 Francis Parkman Prize as best book in American history. Together with Andrew Cayton (Miami University), he has recently published The Dominion of War: Empire and Liberty in North America, 1500-2000 (New York: Viking; London: Atlantic Books, 2005).

His newest book, The War That Made America: A Short History of the French and Indian War (Viking) is a companion to the four-hour PBS series "The War that Made America," which was broadcast January 18 and 25, 2006. The series and book were released to coincide with the 250th anniversary of the French and Indian War, organized by French and Indian War 250 Inc., as part of a collaborative effort with a variety of museums, historic sites and educational workshops spanning several states.

In late 2006, it was announced that Anderson and Cayton have been assigned the volume on the later colonial period (Volume II: 1674-1764) of the newest (and partially published) Oxford History of the United States.

Professor Anderson retired from the University of Colorado-Boulder in 2018.

Publications

As Sole Author
A People's Army: Massachusetts Soldiers and Society in the Seven Years' War.  Univ of North Carolina Press, 1984.  
Crucible of War: The Seven Years' War and the Fate of Empire in British North America, 1754-1766. Knopf, 2000.  
The War That Made America: A Short History of the French and Indian War.  Viking Adult, 2005.

With Andrew Cayton
The Dominion of War: Empire and Liberty in North America, 1500-2000.  Viking Adult, 2004.

As editor
George Washington Remembers: Reflections on the French and Indian War.  Rowman & Littlefield Publishers, 2004.

References

External links
 Interview on The Dominion of War at the Pritzker Military Museum & Library
University of Colorado official faculty page

1949 births
Colorado State University alumni
 Harvard Graduate School of Arts and Sciences alumni
Harvard University faculty
Historians of the United States
Living people
University of Colorado faculty
21st-century American historians
21st-century American male writers
American male non-fiction writers